A for Apple is a 2019 Malayalam-language film directed by the duo B. Madhu and S. Kumar and produced by Sudarsanan Kanjiramkulam. The story was by P. F. Mathews and the screenplay was written by Rajesh Jayaraman. Jerry Amaldev is the music composer and Sreekumaran Thampi was the lyricist; Bijibal composed the background score. Tony Sigimon, Janvi Byju, Nedumudi Venu, Sheela, Salim Kumar, Devan, and Santhosh Keezhattoor acted in the film's major roles.

Plot
Years after he left, Achu is back looking for his childhood friend Vishnupriya. Although she has changed beyond his recognition, he still loves her and tries to win her over. Vishnupriya, now a rebel activist, is looking for answers from her past and has no time for love.

Cast

  Tony Sijimon as Achu
 Gourav Menon as Young Achu
  Janvi Byju as Vishnupriya
 Baby Niranjana as Young Vishnupriya
 Nedumudi Venu as Narayanan
 Sheela as Lakshmi
 Krishna Kumar as advocate Ram Mohan
 Devan as Ahmed Haji
 Santhosh Keezhattoor as Sub Inspector Jayasankar
 Salim Kumar as Muhammed
 Sajal SS as Anish
 Pradeep Kottayam 
 Sethu Lakshmi
 Saju Navodaya
 Kalyani Nair

Music
Jerry Amaldev was the music director and Bijibal composed the background score. Sreekumaran Thampi was the lyricist. Sound mixing was done by Krishnan Unni.

References

External links 
 

2010s Malayalam-language films
2019 films